Francis Dunham (10 November 1793 – 1878) was an English first-class cricketer associated with Marylebone Cricket Club who was active in the 1810s. He is recorded in one match in 1815, totalling 4 runs with a highest score of 4.

References

English cricketers
English cricketers of 1787 to 1825
Non-international England cricketers
1793 births
1878 deaths